Martin Wilkinson is an English football manager.

He has managed the following clubs:
Peterborough United: 29 June 1982 – 1 February 1983
Íþróttabandalag Ísafjarðar: 1983
Carlisle United: 25 June 1999 – 10 May 2000
Northampton Town: 24 February 2003 – 29 September 2003

References

Living people
Year of birth missing (living people)
Place of birth missing (living people)
English football managers
Peterborough United F.C. managers
Carlisle United F.C. managers
Northampton Town F.C. managers
English Football League managers
Úrvalsdeild karla (football) managers
Íþróttabandalag Ísafjarðar